Oru Oorla Oru Rajakumari is a 1995 Indian Tamil-language romantic comedy film written and directed by K. Bhagyaraj who stars alongside Meena. The film was released on 15 January 1995, and became a box office success.

Plot 
Venkata Subramaniam "Venkat" is an educated unemployed bachelor who is living with his brothers' family. Being jobless his brothers and their wives insult him often and make him to do ruthless works for their sake. Venkat does everything for them but they don't stop to humiliating him. The only person who showers love for him is his grandmother who dreams that her grandson has a bright future and he would marry a Princess.

Lakshmi Prabha is an owner of a Neelagiri Estate and hails from a Royal lineage. During her engagement her father gets a phone call that all his shares face downfall and their properties are lost. This makes all the relatives to stop the ceremony and flee from the home as they fear nothing will be left for them. But the phone call is actually a wrong call and their shares and properties are safe. But before knowing this, her father dies of a heart attack. Prabha is very depressed on her father's death and her relative's attitude. She decides that she would marry a person whom she loves rather than a person who is from Royal family like her. Her friend invites her to her home for change of place and she goes there. The house happened to be the neighbour house of Venkat. Prabha observes everything about Venkat, his family and his jobless condition. She finds how helpful he is when he helps an abandoned child despite his struggle. She offers a job in her estate as manager but does not reveal herself. Venkat goes to Neelagiri Estate to join in his new job. He meets king of the palace who is actually not king but accountant acting as king as per Prabha's plan. Prabha introduces herself as Lakshmi, servant maid of the palace. Venkat who believes that as per grandmother's dream he would marry a princess and sets for search of his bride. Prabha loves him but does not reveal that she is a princess as she does not want a man who comes for her Royal identity and money but who comes only for her. Since Lakshmi is just a servant maid he does not show interest on her. But Prabha waits patiently for Venkat to love servant Lakshmi not Princess Prabha.

Venkat's grandmother comes to Neelagiri estate. She finds Lakshmi is a very nice girl and would be apt for her grandson. She insists this to Venkat but he does not show interest. He goes after a Princess of another palace which is disliked by his grandmother. Lakshmi feels disappointed that he also goes after money like others but confident that he would come back. Venkat arranges for a groom visit for Lakshmi against her wishes. The groom is a very cunning man and soon finds out about Lakshmi and her background. So he does not stop following her. Venkat finds that he cannot marry the princess due to her background. He now understands Lakshmi, her character and her love for him. He decides to marry her but does not reveal to her as he wants to surprise her with their wedding invitation. Lakshmi misunderstands that he is going to marry another princess. With a broken heart she presents him the most precious stone of the Royal family. Without knowing the significance of the stone he takes it to temple which leads to police arrest for stealing Royal property. Venkat now understands that Lakshmi is not a servant maid but Princess Lakshmi Prabha. Venkat resigns his job and leaves the place. His grandmother urges him to reveal the love as Lakshmi is a princess as he wished. But Prabha begs not to say his love as she wanted a man who loves her and not her background. She does not want to accept his love after he knows about her.

The groom pretends that he cares for Venkat and Prabha and promises that he will bring him back. Venkat shows the wedding invitation of them to his grandmother to prove that he loved her and not her background. Grandmother rushes to show this invitation to Prabha but Venkat tries to stop her.
The groom on other hand pretends to chase Venkat. Prabha follows to stop chasing Venkat. In a collapse and struggle Prabha finds the wedding invitation and understands that Venkat loved her when she was servant maid Lakshmi. She happily accepts his love and unites with him.

Cast 
 K. Bhagyaraj as Venkatasubramaniam aka Venkat
 Meena as Princess Lakshmi Prabha/Servant maid Lakshmi
 Livingston
 Janagaraj as Accountant Ekambaraeshwarar
 Vijayakumar
 Nirmalamma
 C. R. Saraswathi
 Charle
 Kumarimuthu
 Nalinikanth

Production 
Bhagyaraj offered the role of a drunkard to Charle, feeling only he could pull if off properly.

Soundtrack 
The music was composed by Ilaiyaraaja, with lyrics by Vaali.

Reception 
K. Vijiyan of New Straits Times wrote, "Oru Ooruleh Oru Rajakumari would have been an impossible fairytale for any other director to carry off. Bhagiaraj makes it just a little more believable". R.P.R. of Kalki called the climax and music the film's biggest strengths.

References

External links 

1990s Tamil-language films
1995 films
1995 romantic comedy films
Films directed by K. Bhagyaraj
Films scored by Ilaiyaraaja
Films shot in Ooty
Indian romantic comedy films